Pomatrum is an extinct vetulicolian, the senior synonym of Xidazoon; the latter taxon was described by Shu, et al. (1999) based on fossils found in the Qiongzhusi (Chiungchussu) Formation, Yu'anshan Member (Eoredlichia zone), Lower Cambrian, Haikou, (Kunming), about 50 km west of Chengjiang, China.  It has been likened to the chordate Pipiscius.

The fossils show that the body of the animal was divided into two parts. The anterior part of the body is moderately inflated, with a prominent mouth circlet. It has faint transverse divisions towards the front, but is otherwise smooth. The mouth circlet consists of about 30 plates divided into inner and outer regions. The anterior section has five structures on each side, which are interpreted as gills. A dark region running close to the ventral and posterior margins is interpreted as an endostyle. The condition of the anterior portion of the fossils suggests that it was thin-walled, i.e., that the anterior portion was largely hollow.  The posterior part of the body tapers towards front and back (diamond-shaped), and is divided into seven segments covered in cuticle with three less well-defined segments at the anterior end. There are short spines at the posterior tip. The authors describe an alimentary canal with terminal openings and a rectum with what might be dilator muscles.

Based on a comparison of the incomplete/damaged holotype with the incomplete/damaged holotype of Pomatrum ventralis, researchers Aldridge, et al., proposed that X. stephanus was a junior synonym of P. ventralis because the anterior portions of the two species are largely identical.

See also 

 Maotianshan shales

References 

 

Animals described in 1999
Maotianshan shales fossils
Monotypic vertebrate genera
Prehistoric vertebrate genera
Vetulicolia
Cambrian genus extinctions